The Report of the Committee on Company Law Amendment (1945) Cm 6659, known best as the "Cohen Report" for short, was a company law reform committee appointed by the United Kingdom Coalition Government, during the Second World War. It was chaired by Lord Cohen.

Background
The Committee was appointed in June 1943 by Hugh Dalton, who later became Chancellor of the Exchequer.

Recommendations
This report recommended that shareholders be given a greater degree of control over directors, and led to CA 1948 s 184, then CA 1985 s 303, now CA 2006 s 168
This also recommended that payments to directors on retirement should be subject to company approval (para 92, then CA 1947, then s 192 CA 1948).
p 47 said ‘the suggestion that managing directors are paid excessive sums is, as a rule, unfounded’ but recommended disclosure of aggregate compensation of directors as a group, including payment for outside services.
p 50 expressed concern about directors buying and selling shares with inside knowledge of the company, but merely recommended publicity (cf s 16 Securities Exchange Act, s 17 Public Utility Holding Company Act)
p 51 recommended loans to directors be prohibited, except where companies are in the loan making business
p 50 rejects the suggestion that interested directors could vote on transactions in which they are interested, as being impracticable
It recommended abolition of the ultra vires rule, so every company has the capacity of a normal individual (this was done by the Companies Act 1989, now in CA 2006 s 40)
It proposed that the Board of Trade would be given power to litigate on behalf of shareholders across the country
para 126, twenty one days for annual meetings and meetings with special resolutions pending, fourteen days for others.

See also
UK company law

Notes

References
E Merrick Dodd, 'Review: Report of the Committee on Company Law Amendment' (1945) 58(8) Harvard Law Review 1258

External links
Full text of the Cohen Report on takeovers.gov.au

United Kingdom company law
1945 in British law
Reports of the United Kingdom government